Bechhiwara railway station is a railway station on Ahmedabad–Udaipur Line under the Ajmer railway division of North Western Railway zone. This is situated beside National Highway 8 at Bichhiwara in Dungarpur district of the Indian state of Rajasthan.

References

Ajmer railway division
Railway stations in Dungarpur district